Víctor Humberto Mena Dolmo (born 2 August 1980) is a Honduran footballer who plays as a midfielder for Honduran National League club Atlético Choloma.

Club career
Mena played for several teams in the Honduran National League and joined Real España for the 2012 Apertura championship but lost his place in the team under Chelato Uclés and moved on to Atlético Choloma for the 2013 Clausura.

International career
Mena made his debut for Honduras in an October 2003 friendly match against Bolivia and has, as of January 2013, earned a total of 9 caps, scoring no goals. He was recalled to the national team in 2010 after a four-year hiatus.

References

External links 
 

1980 births
Living people
People from Colón Department (Honduras)
Association football defenders
Honduran footballers
Honduras international footballers
F.C. Motagua players
Changchun Yatai F.C. players
Chinese Super League players
Hispano players
C.D. Real Juventud players
C.D. Victoria players
C.D.S. Vida players
Real C.D. España players
Liga Nacional de Fútbol Profesional de Honduras players
Honduran expatriate footballers
Honduran expatriate sportspeople in China
Expatriate footballers in China